General elections were held in San Marino on 7 September 1969. The Sammarinese Christian Democratic Party remained the largest party, winning 27 of the 60 seats in the Grand and General Council, and formed a coalition with the Independent Democratic Socialist Party, together holding 38 of the 60 seats. The Christian Democratic Party had flown in 400 supporters from the United States to vote for them.

Electoral system
Voters had to be citizens of San Marino and at least 24 years old.

Results
The new Communist Party (Marxist–Leninist) of San Marino failed to win a seat, the first time a party contesting a Sammarinese election had failed to gain parliamentary representation.

References

San Marino
General elections in San Marino
1969 in San Marino
San Marino